Events during the year 1992 in Poland.

Incumbents

Events 
2 March – Poland establishes diplomatic relations with Belarus, becoming one of the first countries to recognise the independence of Belarus.
16 October – A new Act of Parliament re-establishes the former Order of Merit of the Polish People's Republic under the new name Order of Merit of the Republic of Poland (Order Zasługi Rzeczypospolitej Polskiej).

Births 

 27 June: Michał Daszek, handball player
 27 November: Tola Szlagowska, singer

Deaths 
 18 May: Janusz Kruk, musician (born 1946)
 22 December: Milo Sperber, actor, director and writer (born 1911)

References